The Partridge and Orange is an artificial fly commonly categorized as a wet fly or soft hackle and is fished under the water surface. The fly is a very well known fly with its roots set firmly in English angling history. It is an impressionistic pattern fished successfully during caddis hatches and spinner falls. The Partridge and Orange is traditionally a trout and grayling pattern but may be used for other aquatic insect feeding species.

Origin

Soft-hackled flies as they are known today and in particular The Partridge and Orange originated in the north country of England and were first described by Joseph Wells in his 1842 publication THE CONTEMPLATIVE ANGLER. Later, T. E. Pritt's Yorkshire Trout Flies (1895) publication built upon Wells' earlier work and contained many of Wells' listed patterns, and were probably from the same source.

Sylvester Nemes in The Soft-hackled Fly popularized this style of artificial fly in the early 1980s while giving credit to Pritt and many others for the evolution of this genera of pattern which had also been known as spiders.

Imitates

The Partridge and Orange resembles emerging caddis pupa, diving adult caddis or sunken may fly spinners

Pattern
 Hook: 12 – 18 medium/light wet fly or caddis pupa
 Thread: Orange 6/0 or 8/0
 Body: Formed with tying thread
 Rib: Fine gold wire (optional)
 Hackle: Mottled brown partridge

Variations and sizes
The Partridge and Orange is typically tied on standard wet fly and nymph hooks unweighted but may be tied on short caddis pupa hooks. Some tiers tie a bead head version. The gold ribbing may be omitted or replaced with a thread ribbing. There are similar versions of this fly known as the Partridge and Yellow and the Partridge and Green. Many tiers include a small section of fur dubbing for a thorax. Soft-hackle nymphs based on the Partridge and Orange design are tied with a wide variety of quill, feather and dubbed bodies.

Gallery

References

Further reading

Smith, Robert L (2015). The North Country Fly: Yorkshire's Soft Hackle Tradition. Machynlleth, Powys. Coch-y-Bonddu Books. .

External links
 Partridge and Orange at FlyAnglersOnline
 Tying the Partridge and Orange
 The Lost Flies of The Yorkshire Dales
 Seven Magnificent North Country Spiders

Wet fly patterns